The Sun Also Rises is a 2007 film directed, produced and co-written by Chinese director Jiang Wen starring Joan Chen, Anthony Wong, Jaycee Chan, and Jiang Wen himself. This movie is the polyptych of interconnected stories in different time-zones, shifting between a Yunnan village, a campus, and the Gobi Desert. This movie was screened in competition at the Venice International Film Festival and nominated for Golden Lion but lost to Ang Lee's historical thriller Lust, Caution. This film also premiered at the 2007 Toronto International Film Festival on September 9, and was nominated for Achievement in Cinematography at the 2007 Asia Pacific Screen Awards.

Plot
The movie details four interconnected stories.

In the first story, madness and mischief as a single mother (Zhou Yun) drives her devoted son (Jaycee Chan) to distraction with her daredevil antics in pursuit of tranquility. The agile mom climbs tall trees and stands perilously astride a small earthen raft on the river. She treasures a beautiful pair of slippers that she is forever losing, and the son fears that, one day, the footwear will remain while his mother disappears.

In the second story, on a college campus, two old friends find their friendship tested by rivalry over a woman. Doctor Lin (Joan Chen) is the mistress of Old Tang (Jiang Wen), but she finds herself drawn to a teacher named Liang (Anthony Wong). When Liang is accused of groping women at a campus gathering, Lin offers her rear end behind a curtain to determine whose was the guilty hand.

Old Tang, who is a hunter, has a young wife (Kong Wei) who begins a relationship with the madwoman's son. One day, Tang overhears their noises of passion and his wife whispering that her husband says her belly is like velvet. He determines to shoot the young man but is given pause when the boy asks him, "What is velvet?"

The final episode involves all the characters in a dreamlike sequence that brings their lives full circle.

Cast
Jiang Wen as Old Tang
Joan Chen as Doctor Lin
Zhou Yun as Mad Mother
Jaycee Chan as The Son
Anthony Wong as Teacher Liang
Kong Wei as Tang's Wife

Reviews
The film received mostly positive reviews from critics, despite its lukewarm commercial reception. Writers at the 2007 Toronto International Film Festival mentioned "a new aesthetic of magical realism, Jiang deftly defies the gravity of linear storytelling to produce sheer visual poetry. This gallery of lavishly composed frames may seem to follow an irrational logic but, in the end, the imagery is as rare and precious as velvet was scarce in the isolated China the film so vividly depicts." Ray Bennett of The Hollywood Reporter wrote "Fluid motion and glorious colors provide a visual treat in Jiang Wen's sumptuous romantic fantasy... besides being wonderful to look at, The Sun Also Rises is great fun, with sure-handed performances." Moreover, the film was rumored to be China's official entries to the 2008 Oscars bidding with Lust, Caution and The Warlords.

Critic and filmmaker Bilge Ebiri, however, described it as perhaps "one of the strangest pictures I've ever seen" and found it increasingly "more frenetic and absurd", despite acknowledging a "stylish delirium" near the end. Writing in Muse Magazine, Perry Lam also gave a negative review, criticizing "Jiang's timidity and the small-mindedness of his new movie."

References

External links
 
 
 Toronto International Film Festival official site - The Sun Also Rises Entry

2007 films
2000s Mandarin-language films
Films based on Chinese novels
2000s fantasy drama films
Films scored by Joe Hisaishi
Films directed by Jiang Wen
Magic realism films
Chinese fantasy drama films
2007 drama films